Samuel Eto'o is a retired Cameroonian professional footballer who played as a striker for the Cameroon national football team from 1997 to 2014. He is currently Cameroon's all-time goalscorer with 56 goals and 118 appearances, which also puts him as his nation's 2nd-most capped player behind Rigobert Song (137). He has represented his country at 4 FIFA World Cups (1998, 2002, 2010, 2014), 6 Africa Cup of Nations (2000, 2002, 2004, 2006, 2008, 2010), and the 2003 FIFA Confederations Cup. He has helped Les Lions Indomptables win both the 2000 and 2002 Africa Cup of Nations finals and also reached the 2003 FIFA Confederations Cup Final, which they lost to France. He earned his first cap for Cameroon in 1997 during a 5–0 loss in a friendly against Costa Rica. However, he wouldn't score a goal until 2000 in a 3–0 win against Ivory Coast in a 2000 Africa Cup of Nations group stage match. His only hat-trick while playing for Cameroon would come in a 3–1 win against Angola in a 2006 Africa Cup of Nations group stage match. He eventually decided to retire from international duty in 2014 after joining Everton.

List of goals
Scores and results list Cameroon's goal tally first.

Statistics

References

Eto, Samuel
Cameroon national football team